Marius Dewilde (1921–1996) was a French railway worker who claimed to have become a contactee for two extraterrestrial life-forms in 1954.

The encounter 
Dewilde, a railway guardian, lived in a house by the tracks close to the railway station at Quarouble, Nord, France. According to Dewilde, on the night of September 10, 1954, his dog started barking at 22:30. Dewilde initially ignored the dog, but went outside with a flashlight after his dog continued to bark frantically. He walked towards the tracks, and he saw an object some 6 or 7 metres away from him. Behind him, he could hear some steps. When he pointed the flashlight, Dewilde saw two small humanoid figures, "about 80 cm to 1 metre…." When the light was pointed to their heads, it was reflected as if they were wearing a mirror helmet or something.

Suddenly, a light beam came off the object he saw on the tracks and left him paralyzed. He slowly looked back and saw a door opening at the object behind him. The beings boarded the object and it took off towards the sky, changing its colors in the meanwhile.

When he recovered his movements, he attempted to tell his wife and then his neighbor of what he had just seen, but neither of them had seen nor heard anything. He then tried the local police, which sent some police officers to his home. Dewilde could not approach the point where everything happened, because it made him feel sick, giving the officers a certainty that his story was not a hoax. Also, objects which are energized by battery, like Dewilde's flashlight and telephone, stopped working. Before sunrise, investigators were already all over the place.

Aftermath 

When people were investigating the point, an approaching train produced a very loud noise when passing by, making it stop. A six-meter depression was found on the exact point where the object had landed, and was immediately said to be the cause of the noise.

By light of day, more details were uncovered: the small rocks under the train tracks were all carbonized on the depression. The sleepers between the steel lines also featured some symmetric marks.

The incident was made famous by the local magazine RADAR.

Following the incident, there were other occurrences: Dewilde suffered from respiratory problems, and his dog died three days after the encounter. Three cows in nearby farms were found dead, and their autopsies revealed that their blood had been totally and unexplainably removed. Also, several local people claimed sightings of objects and creatures similar to the ones witnessed by Dewilde.

See also
 UFO sightings in France

References

External links 
Marius Dewilde at Ufologie.net, with photos of the incident 

1921 births
1954 in France
1996 deaths
Contactees